The Sabaragamuwa Province ( Sabaragamuwa Paḷāta,  Sabaragamuwa Mākāṇam) is one of the nine provinces of Sri Lanka, the first level administrative division of the country. The provinces have existed since the 19th century but did not have any legal status until 1987 when the 13th Amendment to the Constitution of Sri Lanka established provincial councils. The Sabaragamuwa Province contains two districts: Ratnapura and Kegalle. It is named after its former indigenous inhabitants, namely the Sabara, an indic term for hunter-gatherer tribes, a term seldom used in ancient Sri Lanka. Sabaragamuwa University is in Belihuloya.

Districts
Sabaragamuwa is divided into 2 districts:
 Kegalle District 
 Ratnapura District

Municipal Council

 Ratnapura

Urban Council

 Balangoda
 Embilipitiya
 Kegalle

Other Towns
Bulathkohupitiya
 Belihuloya
 Eheliyagoda
 Kalawana
 Kuruwita
 Mawanella
 Aranayaka
 Rakwana
 Imbulpe
 Deraniyagala
 Ambepussa
 Rambukkana
 Kitulgala
 Panamure
 Godakawela

Demographics

Ethnic groups

Sinhalese are the majority of Sabaragamuwa province which makes 86.4% of the province. Sinhalese who makes the majority of the Sabaragamuwa province as well as the majority of the country speak Sinhala language which is an Indo-Aryan language. 

Indian Tamils is 5.49% of the province. Indian Tamils were brought to Sri Lanka by Britishers as workers in tea plantations and rubber plantations. 

Moors make 4.27% of the province. The origins of the Moors refer to Arab traders who landed on the island in the 8th-9th centuries.Also many Moors can speak Sinhala language as their mother tongue. Moors speak Tamil language as their second language.

Sri Lankan Tamils are 3.75% of the Sabaragamuwa province. Sri Lankan Tamils speak Tamil language which is their mother tongue.

Religion

Buddhism is 85.7% in Sabaragamuwa province. Buddhism is followed by majority Sinhalese. Also a small Tamil population follow Buddhism.
Hinduism is 8.1% in Sabaragamuwa province. Indian Tamils and Sri Lankan Tamils follow Hinduism.
Islam is 4.43% which is followed by Moors. And Christianity make 1.72% of the province.

See also
 Provinces of Sri Lanka
 Districts of Sri Lanka

References

External links
 Cities in Sabaragamuwa province 
 Postal codes of Sabaragamuwa province

 
Provinces of Sri Lanka
Kingdom of Kandy